Angelo Conterno (13 March 1925 – 1 December 2007) was an Italian professional road racing cyclist during the 1950s and early 1960s who is most famous for becoming the first Italian to win the Vuelta a España. At the 1956 Vuelta after winning Stage 2 and capturing the golden jersey, Conterno, in one of the closest Vuelta's in history, outlasted Spaniard Jesus Loroño to win the overall title by just 13 seconds. The following year, Loroño won the 1957 Vuelta a España without Conterno in attendance.

Earlier in his career, Conterno wore the pink jersey as leader of the general classification for a day when he won the second stage of the 1952 Giro d'Italia. Beyond his three-stage victories in the Giro d'Italia, he won the 1959 Züri-Metzgete.

Major achievements 

1952 – Frejus
 5th, Overall, Giro d’Italia
 1st, Stage 2, (Abetone - Montecatini Terme, 197 km)
 general classification leader (after Stage 2)
1953 – Frejus
 5th, Overall, Giro d'Italia
1954 – Frejus
 1st, Giro di Lazio
 3rd, Giro del Piemonte
 10th, Overall, Giro d'Italia
 1st, Stage 4, (Catanzaro - Bari, 352 km)
1955 – Torpado
 2nd, Giro del Piemonte
 3rd, Giro di Lombardia
 18th, Overall, Giro d’Italia
 1st, Stage 18, (Trieste - Cortina d'Ampezzo, 236 km)
1956
 1st, Overall,  Vuelta a España
 1st, Stage 2, (Santander - Oviedo, 248 km)
 41st, Overall, Tour de France
1957
 1st, Giro del Veneto
 3rd, Giro dell'Emilia
 3rd, Tre Valli Varesine
1958
 3rd, Tour of Flanders
1959
 1st, Züri-Metzgete
 3rd, Giro di Lazio
1960
 3rd, Tre Valli Varesine
1961
 1st, Giro del Piemonte
 2nd, Milano–Torino
1963
 2nd, Züri-Metzgete

External links 

1925 births
2007 deaths
Cyclists from Turin
Italian male cyclists
Vuelta a España winners
Italian Giro d'Italia stage winners
Italian Vuelta a España stage winners